Pesquera is a municipality located in the autonomous community of Cantabria, Spain.

Localities
Its 69 inhabitants (INE, 2008) live in:

 Pesquera (Capital), 43 hab.
 Ventorrillo, 26 hab.
 Somaconcha, deshabitada.

References

Municipalities in Cantabria